The Barrett House (circa 1800), also known as Forest Hall, is a Federal style American mansion located in New Ipswich, New Hampshire, part of the New Ipswich Center Village Historic District. It is now a nonprofit museum operated by Historic New England and open to the public several days a year. An admission fee is charged.

History

According to tradition, Forest Hall was built as a wedding gift for Charles Barrett and his bride by his father, a prosperous farmer in town who had invested in a glass factory, a toll road, a canal system, and, most successfully, in New Hampshire's first cotton mill. The interiors are elegantly furnished, and numerous reception rooms were designed for entertaining in a cosmopolitan manner. An elaborate allée was later added to the landscape, with a flight of stone steps flanked by maples rising up the hillside behind the house and leading to an elegant summerhouse.

However, after the railroad bypassed New Ipswich, the town entered into a decline. Charles Barrett's descendants stayed on, but today Forest Hall remains essentially a relic of the Federal era. After 1887, the family used the house only in the summer-time. It was donated to Historic New England in 1950.

Barrett House was one of the filming locations for the 1979 Merchant Ivory Productions film adaptation of the Henry James novel entitled The Europeans.

See also
New Hampshire Historical Marker No. 137: Barrett House

References

External links
 Historic New England website information

Houses completed in 1800
Historic house museums in New Hampshire
Museums in Hillsborough County, New Hampshire
Houses in Hillsborough County, New Hampshire
Historic district contributing properties in New Hampshire
Historic New England
New Ipswich, New Hampshire
National Register of Historic Places in Hillsborough County, New Hampshire
Houses on the National Register of Historic Places in New Hampshire